Naaya Aayam Multi-Disciplinary Institute (NAMI), established in 2013, is an education foundation located in Gokarneshwor - 7,Jorpati, Kathmandu, Nepal. The college directly works with its roots tied to University of Northampton, UK, providing Undergraduate and Graduate Degrees and Cambridge International Examinations for GCE ‘A’ Level.

Infrastructure

NAMI is stretched over 37 ropani land built with modern auditoriums, classrooms, tutorial/discussion rooms, library and computer and science laboratories.  It also has sports arena for basketball, mini-football and cricket practice pitch.

Notable people
 Arzu Rana Deuba– Chairperson, UNESCO Regional Councillor, founder and former president of SAATHI and Rural Women's Development and Unity Centre (RUWDUC)

References

Educational institutions established in 2013
Schools in Kathmandu
Nepalese awards
2013 establishments in Nepal